Aaron M. Thompson (born February 28, 1987) is an American former professional baseball pitcher. He played in Major League Baseball (MLB) for the Pittsburgh Pirates and Minnesota Twins.

Early life
Thompson was born in Santa Fe, New Mexico. He grew up in Beaumont, Texas, and then graduated from Second Baptist High School of Houston in 2005. While there, he went 8-3 with two saves and 0.84 earned run average in 14 games as a senior, with 133 strikeouts and 35 walks in 66 innings. Brother of Will Thompson, professional actor and creator of Free Native, and Luke Milstead, a two-time Texas academic All-State athlete.

Professional career

Florida Marlins
He had signed a National Letter of Intent with Texas A&M, but was drafted in the first round (22nd overall) of the 2005 Major League Baseball Draft and joined the Florida Marlins organization.

While with the Marlins; Thompson was selected as organizational Pitcher of the Month, Player of the Week, and he represented his club as a member of the South Atlantic League All-Star Team.

Washington Nationals
The Washington Nationals acquired him at the 2009 trade deadline for first baseman Nick Johnson. He spent most of his time with the club's AA Harrisburg Senators affiliate as a starter.

Pittsburgh Pirates
The Pittsburgh Pirates claimed Thompson off waivers from the Nationals on December 24, 2010.

On August 24, 2011, Thompson made his major league debut for the Pirates at PNC Park. During the game, he pitched  scoreless innings, before being relieved in the 2-0 shutout over the Milwaukee Brewers.

Following the 2011 season, Thompson played  for the Toros del Este of the LIDOM.

Minnesota Twins
Thompson signed a minor league contract with the Minnesota Twins on December 15, 2011. Between 2012 and 2013, he pitched almost exclusively out of the bullpen, totaling 64 appearances. He also played the first half of the 2013 winter ball season with the Aragua Tigres of the LVBP and was named "Setup del Ano" for the league that season.

On August 30, 2014, Thompson was called up and added to the Twins roster. He pitched in seven games as a reliever, getting six strikeouts and posting an ERA of 2.45.

In 2015, he joined the Twins bullpen and pitched primarily in a middle-relief role, contributing largely to the team's first-half success. Upon the return of Ervin Santana from steroid suspension, Thompson was demoted to Triple A Rochester where he finished the season. Over the following winter he would travel to play for the Canberra Cavalry of the Australian Baseball League. He was later was released from the Twins at the end of the following Spring Training on April 11, 2016.

Sugar Land Skeeters
Thompson signed with the Sugar Land Skeeters Of The Atlantic League of Professional Baseball following his release from the Twins and concluded his 2016 season with them.

Tomateros De Culiacán
Thompson pitched for Tomateros de Culiacán in the Mexican Pacific League in 2017.

Thompson retired from professional baseball in February 2017.

References

External links

1987 births
Living people
Baseball players from New Mexico
Major League Baseball pitchers
Sportspeople from Santa Fe, New Mexico
Pittsburgh Pirates players
Minnesota Twins players
Altoona Curve players
Carolina Mudcats players
Greensboro Grasshoppers players
Gulf Coast Marlins players
Harrisburg Senators players
Indianapolis Indians players
Jacksonville Suns players
Jamestown Jammers players
Jupiter Hammerheads players
Mesa Solar Sox players
Syracuse Chiefs players
New Britain Rock Cats players
Rochester Red Wings players
Toros del Este players
American expatriate baseball players in the Dominican Republic
Tigres de Aragua players
American expatriate baseball players in Venezuela
Canberra Cavalry players
Sugar Land Skeeters players
Tomateros de Culiacán players
American expatriate baseball players in Mexico
American expatriate baseball players in Australia